Bildjournalen (Swedish: The Picture Journal) was a youth magazine published from 1954 to 1969. It was first youth magazine of Sweden. During its existence it was the most popular magazine in its category.

History and profile
Bildjournalen was established in 1954. The magazine was modeled on 17 and Hit Parader magazines. It was part of and published by Åhlén & Åkerlund. Its headquarters was in Malmö. A movie magazine, Filmjournalen, merged with it.

The magazine covered all the topics, which young people were interested in, such as music, movies, beauty tips, fashion, novels, news about society and current events. These articles were accompanied by large photographs. The magazine offered several flexi discs. The contributors were the leading Swedish journalists and photographers: Cecilia Hagen, Staffan Heimerson, Anja Notini, Gunilla Pontén, Anders Engman and Bengt H Malmqvist. Bertil Torekull was one of the editors-in-chief of the magazine, who was also the editor-in-chief of another magazine Veckorevyn.

In 1959, Bildjournalen had a circulation of 230,000 copies. The magazine ceased publication in 1969. In 2011 a book about Bildjournalen was published by Premium Publishing.

References

1954 establishments in Sweden
1969 disestablishments in Sweden
Defunct magazines published in Sweden
Magazines established in 1954
Magazines disestablished in 1969
Mass media in Malmö
Swedish-language magazines
Youth magazines